Yiorgos Batis (also Giorgos Batis) (1885 – 10 March 1967) was one of the first rebetes influential to rebetiko music. His real name was Yiorgos Tsoros although he was known as Yiorgos Ampatis. He had a great love for music and musical instruments (bouzouki, baglamas, etc.).

Life and career
He was born in Methana in 1885 and moved to Piraeus when he was very young.

He served in the Greek army from 1912 to 1918. In the mid-1920s, he opened a music school called "Carmen". He opened a café named "Georges Baté" in 1931 and formed one of the most important scenes of rebetiko music. He continued to work as a quack-salesman, improvising drugs for painful teeth and other minor ailments. He kept a collection of many instruments and also used to name them. In 1933, Yiorgos Batis did his first sound-recording with bouzouki in Greece. In the 1930s, he dedicated himself solely to music and collaborated closely with, among others,  Markos Vamvakaris in the rebetiko band ("kompania") called I Tetras i Xakousti tou Peiraios - the Famous Quartet of Piraeus.  However, it did not light up the charts. He appeared in Alekos Sakelariou's film "Oi papatzides (Οι παπατζήδες)" (1954). He died in Piraeus on March 10, 1967.

External links
Biography on Yiorgos Batis 
Screen shots of Yiorgos Batis in the film "Oi papatzides (Οι παπατζήδες)" (1954)

1885 births
1967 deaths
20th-century Greek male singers
Greek rebetiko singers
People from Troizinia-Methana